David Hammel (November 26, 1838October 13, 1928) was a German American immigrant, businessman, and Democratic politician.  He served as the 27th and 29th mayor of Appleton, Wisconsin, and represented Outagamie County in the Wisconsin State Assembly in 1876 and 1877.

Biography

Hammel was born in Gemünden, Rhein-Hunsrück, which was then part of the Rhine Province of the Kingdom of Prussia (modern day Germany).  He was educated in the German common schools until 1853, when, at age 14, he emigrated to the United States with his older brother, Jacob.  He settled first at Syracuse, New York, and attended school at Ithaca, New York.  After leaving school, he remained in Ithaca for several years, working for his brother in dry good sales.  In 1857, he moved to Hamilton, Ontario, and started a cigar business, which he operated successfully for several years.

In 1866, he followed the recommendation of some friends to move to Milwaukee, but remained there only briefly before settling permanently at Appleton, Wisconsin.  At Appleton, he quickly established a new enterprise as a dealer of work horses, cattle, and oxen, doing business as D. Hammel & Co.  He briefly also attempted to run a separate merchant and manufacturing business, but abandoned it after a few years.  Later, he became a director and shareholder in the Commercial National Bank in Appleton, and was regarded as one of Appleton's wealthiest residents by 1895.

He was elected on the Democratic ticket to the Wisconsin State Assembly in 1875 and was re-elected in 1876.  He also served as a member and treasurer of the local school board.

In 1900, he was elected Mayor of Appleton.  He was re-elected to another one-year term in 1901, and was elected to two-year terms in 1902 and 1906.

After leaving office, Hammel moved to Austin, Minnesota, and continued in horse and cattle trading until his health failed.  At that point, he moved to Chicago, Illinois, to live with his sons. Hammel died in Chicago as a result of a stroke, in 1928.  His body was returned to Appleton and interred at Zion Cemetery.

Personal life
David Hammel was the youngest of nine children born to Peter and Frederika Hammel ( Gamiel).  His mother also later emigrated to Appleton, and resided there until her death.  He was closely associated in business with his brother, Jacob, throughout much of his life.  Jacob's son, Leopold Hammel, also served in the Wisconsin State Assembly.  The Hammels were a prominent Jewish family in Wisconsin in their time.

David married Lina Vogel, also an immigrant from Prussia, on January 21, 1861.  They had eight children together, though one son died young.

References

External links

1838 births
1928 deaths
German emigrants to the United States
People from the Kingdom of Prussia
Politicians from Appleton, Wisconsin
People from Austin, Minnesota
Politicians from Chicago
Politicians from Syracuse, New York
Businesspeople from Wisconsin
School board members in Wisconsin
Mayors of places in Wisconsin
Businesspeople from Syracuse, New York
Jewish mayors of places in the United States
Democratic Party members of the Wisconsin State Assembly